David's Song may refer to
 King David's Song of Thanksgiving in 2 Samuel 22 in the Hebrew Bible
 Robbie Williams' song David's Song in The Heavy Entertainment Show
 Who'll Come With Me (David's Song) (1979) by The Kelly Family